Turbo (Marmarostoma) markusrufi is a species of sea snail, marine gastropod mollusk in the family Turbinidae.

Description
The shell grows to a length of 35 mm.

Distribution
This marine species occurs at subtidal depths off the Philippines and in the Western Pacific off Palau.

References

 Kreipl K. & Alf A. (2003) Two new species of Turbo (Marmarostoma) (Mollusca – Gastropoda – Turbinidae). Gloria Maris 42 (2-3): 37-46
 Alf A. & Kreipl K. (2011) The family Turbinidae. Subfamily Turbinidae, Genus Turbo. Errata, corrections and new information on the genera Lunella, Modelia and Turbo (vol. I). In: G.T. Poppe & K. Groh (eds), A Conchological Iconography. Hackenheim: Conchbooks. pp. 69–72, pls 96–103.
 Williams, S.T. (2007). Origins and diversification of Indo-West Pacific marine fauna: evolutionary history and biogeography of turban shells (Gastropoda, Turbinidae). Biological Journal of the Linnean Society, 2007, 92, 573–592

External links

markusrufi
Gastropods described in 2003